Peter "Madcat" Ruth can be heard playing his harmonica on over 130 CD's and LP's, from a wide variety of musicians and genres.

Discography
1970 - New Heavenly Blue - Educated Homegrown
1971 - Dave Brubeck - Truth
1972 - Dave Brubeck - Truth Is Fallen
1972 - New Heavenly Blue - New Heavenly Blue
1973 - Dave Brubeck - Two Generations of Brubeck
1973 - Nancy Johnson - Mellow Lady
1974 - Dave Brubeck - Brother, the Great Spirit Made Us All
1975 - Peter Berkow & Friends Thesis
1975 - Sky King - Secret Sauce
1975 - Tom Mitchell - Tom Mitchell
1976 - Peter Stark - Mushroom Country
1977 - Bob White - Bob White
1978 - Mike Smith - Mike Smith and the Country Volunteers	
1978 - Rosalie Sorrels - Traveling Lady Rides Again
1979- Ken Nordine - Stare With Your Ears
1980 - Blackfoot - Tomcattin'
1980 - David Walz - Country Old Country New
1980 - Friedlander & Hall - Utah Moon
1980 - The First Few - Could It Be?
1980 - Trees - Let It Out
1982 - Gemini - Good Mischief
1982 - Rene Meave - A Man In Love	
1982 - Various Artists - Cruisin' Ann Arbor
1983 - Gemini - Swinging
1983 - Gemini - The Long Journey Called Home
1983 - Rich and Maureen DelGrosso - Toe Tappin1983 - Rozaa "Rosay" Wortham - The Unpredictable Moods Of Rosay
1984 - Gemini - Rhythmically Moving 6
1984 - Peter Madcat Ruth - Madcat Gone Solo
1984 - Various Artists - Heavey Duty Harpin'''
1985 - Iowa Rose - Yellow Roses1985 - The Urbations - The Urbations1986 - Gemini - Pulling Together1986 - Ken Nordine - Grandson of Word Jazz1986 - Kitty Donohoe - Farmer In Florida1986 - Yank Rachell - Blues Mandolin Man1987 - Micro Wave and Bootsy Collins - Cookin' From The Inside Out!!!1988 - B&R - To Find You1989 - Gemini - Growing Up Together1989 - Madcat's Pressure Cooker - Live at The Pig1991 - Rory Block - Mama's Blues1991 - Cincinnati Pops Orchestra - Down On The Farm1991 - Cincinnati Pops Orchestra - The Music Man (1991 Concert Cast Recording)1991 - Catfish Keith - Pepper In My Shoe1992 - Madcat & Kane - Key To the Highway1992 - Bill Crofut & Chris Brubeck - Red White & Blues1993 - Rosalie Sorrels - Travelin' Lady Rides Again1993 - Jamie James - Cruel World1994 - Friedlander and Hall - Factory Town1994 - Dan Hall - Fire In The Sun1994 - Peter Madcat Ruth - Harmonicology1995 - Robin & Linda Williams - Good News1995 - Gemini - Lullabies For Our Children1995 - Andy Boller - Face The Light Alone1996 - various artists - Blues From The Heart, Vol. II1996 - Stan Borys - Niczyj1996 - Camille West - Mother Tongue1997 - Kevin Maul - Toolshed1998 - Laz Slomovits - Bright In All Of Us1998 - David Menefee - Brighter Side Of Blue1998 - Chris Buhalis - Kenai Dreams1998 - Anne Hills and Cindy Mangsen - Never Grow Up1999 - Rollie Tussing III - Blow Whistle Blow1999 - Madcat & Kane - Up Against The Wall1999 - Kentucky Standard Band - Kentucky Skies1999 - Julie Austin - Fandagumbo1999 - David Mosher - Long Night Moon1999 - Triple Play - Triple Play Live2000 - Madcat & The Cats - Live at the Ark2000 - Gemini - With You2001 - Patricia Pettinga - Time2001 - Muruga GVCB - God Bless America2001 - Leslie Ritter & Scott Petito - Circles In The Sand2001 - Laz Slomovits - Harbor of the Heart2001 - Joel Mabus - Six of One2001 - Various Artists - Tell It. Think It. Speak It. Breathe It.2002 - The Raisin Pickers - Drivin
2002 - Muruga GVCB - One Global Village2002 - Mississippi Heat - Footprints On The Ceiling2002 - Matt Watroba - The Best Is Yet To Be2002 - Blues Etc. - Blues Etc.2003 - Triple Play - Watching The World2003 - Mustards Retreat - A Resolution Of Something2003 - Jefferson Goncalves - Greia2003 - George Clinton - Six Degrees of P-Funk: The Best of George Clinton & His Funky Family2004 - Beowulf Kingsley (Todd Perkins) - Arphus Schmarphus Horkus Porkus2004 - William Bolcom - Songs of Innocence and of Experience2004 - Rosalie Sorrels - My Last Go Round2004 - Matt Watroba - Jukebox Folk2004 - Jim Bizer - Connected2005 - Hank Woji - Medallion2005 - Mustards Retreat - MR72005 - Jesse Richards - Wild Card2005 - Joel Brown - Christmas Cedar And Spruce2005 - Peter Madcat Ruth - Live In Rio2006 - Peter Madcat Ruth - Harmonica & Ukulele Project2006 - Asylum Street Spankers - Pussycat Bootleg Series, Vol. 2: Live Rarities 2000-20042006 - Jen Sygit - Leaving Marshall St.2006 - Bruce Worman - Love Nudge Reminders2007 - Root Doctor - Change Our Ways2007 - Robert James - Easy Avenue2007 - Jesse Richards - Green Band2007 - Mario Resto - Radio	2 MCD Project2007 - Jefferson Goncalves - Ar Puro2007 - George Kerby - Out Of The Corridor2007 - Gabe Bolkosky & San Slomovits - Home From Work2007 - Beale Street - Vibratto2007 - Annie and Rod Capps - In This Town2008 - Dave Brubeck - Only the Best of Dave Brubeck2008 - Mr. Vegas Man - Hey Santa2008 - Todd Perkins - Arphus Shmarphus Horkus Porkus	
2008 - Bob White - Bob White - Collectors Series2008 - Rosalie Sorrels - Strangers in Another Country2008 - Copper Tom - Get the Beat!2008 - Seth Bernard - This Here2008 - Peter Madcat Ruth - More Real Folk Blues2009 - Laszlo Slomovits - Rumi - Gamble Everything For Love2009 - Cairn to Cairn - Cairn to Cairn2009 - Seth Bernard - Is This You?2009 - Madcat, Kane & Maxwell Street - Live at the Creole Gallery2010 - Trees - One Voice2010 - Laszlo Slomovits - Hafiz and Mystical Companions2010 - Katie Geddes - We Are Each Other's Angels2011 - Joel Brown - Places2011 - Booker, Dansby, Sauter & Love - The Hand I Was Dealt2012 - Dr. Mike & The Sea Monkeys - Meet The Sea Monkeys2012 - Dave Boutette - Mending Time2012 - Chris Brubeck's Triple Play - Live at Zankel Music Center2013 - Muruga & The Cosmic Hoedown Band - Changing The Sound of Your Room2014 - Seth Bernard - Reconciliation and the Mystical Beyonda2014 - Jeff Daniels - Days Like These2014 - The Madcat Midnight Blues Journey - Live at Salt of the Earth2015 - Sumkali - Tihai2015 - Dave Boutette - 1st Rate Companion2016 - T (Featuring Muruga & Madcat Ruth) - Deer Camp2017 - Seth Bernard - Eggtones Blues2017 - Mighty Michael, Peter Madcat Ruth, Muruga Booker - Passing The Torch2017 - Various Artists - Michigan Music Resistance Vol. 12017 - Booker Blues All-Stars - Booker Plays Hooker''

References

Discographies of American artists
Rhythm and blues discographies